Parmena aurora is a species of beetle in the family Cerambycidae. It was described by Mikhail Leontievich Danilevsky in 1980. It is known from Azerbaijan.

References

Parmenini
Beetles described in 1980